Athletes from the Socialist Federal Republic of Yugoslavia competed at the 1976 Winter Olympics in Innsbruck, Austria.

Alpine skiing

Men

Cross-country skiing

Men

Women

Ice hockey

First round
Winners (in bold) entered the Medal Round. Other teams played a consolation round for 7th-12th places.

|}

Consolation Round

Yugoslavia 6-4 Switzerland
Yugoslavia 4-3 Romania
Yugoslavia 8-5 Bulgaria
Japan 4-3 Yugoslavia
Austria 3-1 Yugoslavia

Ski jumping

References
Official Olympic Reports
International Olympic Committee results database
 Olympic Winter Games 1976, full results by sports-reference.com

Nations at the 1976 Winter Olympics
1976
Winter Olympics